The Art Building of the Arkansas Valley Fairgrounds in Rocky Ford, Colorado was built in 1901.  It was listed on the National Register of Historic Places in 1996.

It is a one-story octagonal wood-frame building.

References

External links

Octagonal buildings
National Register of Historic Places in Otero County, Colorado
Buildings and structures completed in 1901